This is a list of American high school students who have run a four-minute mile since the feat was first accomplished in 1964.

The first person to run the mile (1,760 yards, or 1,609.344 metres) in under four minutes was Roger Bannister in 1954, in a time of 3:59.4. This barrier would not be broken by a high school student until 1964, when Jim Ryun ran the distance in a time of 3:59.0 at the Compton Relays. Ryun went on to set a national high school record of 3:55.3, which stood until 2001 when it was broken by Alan Webb. Seventeen U.S. high school students have run the mile in less than four minutes since 1964.

U.S. high school mile record holders

Jim Ryun 
After setting the national high school record in the mile, Jim Ryun set the world record in 1966 and then again in 1967, when he ran 3:51.1. Ryun was 19 at the time, making him the youngest world record holder in the mile to date. His record stood for nine years. Ryun competed in the 1964, 1968 and 1972 Olympic games. He took silver in the men's 1500m at the 1968 Summer Olympics.

Alan Webb 
Alan Webb broke Ryun's 36-year old high school mile record (3:55.3), running 3:53.43 at the Prefontaine Classic in 2001. Webb also set an American record in the mile in 2007 at 3:46.91, making him the eighth-fastest miler in history and the only American to ever run the mile in under 3:47. Despite finding success in high school and on the track, Webb had an inconsistent career that was riddled with injuries, such as achilles tendonitis and a stress fracture in his foot and tibia.

Sub-four-minute mile runs by U.S. high school students

Note: all of the above runners were high school seniors when they ran under four minutes for the mile except for Ryun in 1964, and Burns and Birnbaum in 2022, who were juniors at the time.

References

Middle-distance running
American high school